Aulus Postumius Albinus Regillensis was a Roman politician, of patrician family, in the early 4th century BC. He was appointed consular tribune in 397 BC, and collected with his colleague Lucius Julius Iullus an army of volunteers, since the tribunes prevented them from making a regular levy, and cut off a body of Tarquinienses, who were returning home after plundering the Roman territory.

See also
 Postumia gens

References

4th-century BC Romans
Roman patricians
Roman consular tribunes
Postumii Albini